The Mud River is a  tidal arm of the Sapelo River in McIntosh County, Georgia, in the United States. It forms the northern part of the channel separating Sapelo Island from the mainland.

See also
List of rivers of Georgia

References 

Rivers of Georgia (U.S. state)
Rivers of McIntosh County, Georgia